Páginas Perdidas is the second album of the Costa Rican music group Gandhi.

Track listing
"Al son del dolor"
"Quisieras"
"En dibujos animados"
"Un 1 de un 11"
"La reina (sin saber)"
"El invisible"
"Mi zona"
"Clara"
"Mátame"
"El día que nos quedamos"
"Nada"
"Prólogo"
"En el ático"
"Aquí"
"BONUS TRACK: Al son del dolor (live acoustic)"

2000 albums
Spanish-language albums
Gandhi (Costa Rican band) albums